General elections were held in Papua New Guinea between 14 and 28 June 1997. The result was a victory for the People's Progress Party, which won 16 of the 109 seats, despite receiving fewer votes than the National Alliance Party. Voter turnout was 66%.

Results

References

External links
Centre on Democratic Performance Election Results Archive

Elections in Papua New Guinea
Papua
General
National Parliament of Papua New Guinea
Election and referendum articles with incomplete results